Aaron Aylward is an American politician serving as a member of the South Dakota House of Representatives from the 6th district. Elected in November 2020, he assumed office on January 12, 2021.

Education 
Aylaward earned a Bachelor of Arts degree in exercise science from Dakota State University and a Master of Arts in kinesiology from the University of South Dakota.

Career 
In 2012 and 2013, Aylward worked as a personal trainer. From 2013 to 2019, Aylward worked as a search consultant for Growing People and Companies (GPAC). In 2019, he became a sales representative for Cintas, a business services firm. In 2018, he was an unsuccessful candidate for the South Dakota House as a Libertarian.

References 

Living people
South Dakota Libertarians
Republican Party members of the South Dakota House of Representatives
Dakota State University alumni
University of South Dakota alumni
Year of birth missing (living people)